A tool library is an example of a Library of Things. Tool libraries allow patrons to check out or borrow tools, equipment and "how-to" instructional materials, functioning either as a rental shop, with a charge for borrowing the tools, or more commonly free of charge as a form of community sharing. A tool library performs the following main tasks:
Lending: all kinds of tools for use in volunteer projects, facility maintenance and improvement projects, community improvement events, and special events.
Advocacy: for the complete and timely return of all borrowed tools, to guarantee the long-term sustainability of available inventory. Staff also seeks compensation for lost tools and tools returned late.
Maintenance: performing routine maintenance and repairs on all equipment to ensure good condition and to extend the lifespan of the inventory. This function is typically performed by volunteers and community service workers.
Education: Some tool libraries also provide educational classes. Vancouver Tool Library and Community Access Center (VTLCAC) in Vancouver, Washington offers individual project support and classes on woodworking and basic car maintenance

History 
The first known tool lending library was started by the Gross Pointe Rotary Club in Gross Pointe, Michigan in 1943.

Another early tool lending library was in Columbus, Ohio started in 1976. Originally run by the city, the tool library is now operated by ModCon Living, a non-profit organization that works to preserve and revitalize homes and communities in Central Ohio. The ModCon Living Tool Library makes available over 4,500 tools free of charge to both individuals and non-profit organizations. This tool library was among many in what could be considered the first generation of tool libraries - including The Phinney Tool Library in 1978 and The Berkeley Tool Library in 1979 - most of which were founded in the late 70s or early 80s. Many of these libraries were started with community block grants. A variation of the tool lending library model exists in Atlanta, Georgia. At the Atlanta Community ToolBank, the tools are reserved for use only by nonprofits and other community-based organizations who are performing volunteer and facility maintenance projects. The ToolBank tool inventory is not available to individuals.

In 2009, the community of West Seattle in Washington started the West Seattle Tool Library, which provides a wide variety of tools and resources for individuals and organizations while specifically encouraging sustainable urban living. In 2011, Popular Mechanics recognized "Building a Local Tool Library" as one of its top ten ways to change the world, while highlighting the West Seattle Tool Library.

In response to that recognition, "Share Starter" began to offer a free "Tool Library Starter Kit" to any community interested in starting a lending library of their own.  The kit includes start up guidelines, frequently asked questions, and sample documents. Additionally, the Center for a New American Dream published a webinar which highlighted insights from a handful of tool libraries on how to get started.

Given their increasing popularity and proven history of success, tool libraries and tool banks are now playing a role in the sharing economy and can be found in local public libraries and makerspaces, for instance. There are software platforms for managing tool and other types of lending libraries.

Tool libraries also exist outside of the United States, with several in the UK, for example in Edinburgh, Glasgow and Liverpool.

See also 
 Library of Things
 Library makerspace
 Fab lab
 Hackerspace

References

External links

 Map of tool libraries
 

 Tool-lending
Tool
Public commons
Sharing economy
DIY culture